Jack Feldman is an American lyricist who has written songs for television, film, and Broadway. He has worked on many Disney movies ranging from Oliver & Company to The Lion King II: Simba's Pride, collaborating with Alan Menken on the songs for Newsies.  He wrote the lyrics for Barry Manilow's Grammy Award–winning song "Copacabana" and won a Tony along with Alan Menken for the stage musical version of Newsies. Feldman grew up on Long Island.

Career

Jack Feldman wrote the lyrics in the following works.

Film
 Oliver & Company (song: "Perfect Isn't Easy")
 Newsies
 Home Alone 2 (song: "My Christmas Tree")
 Thumbelina
 A Goofy Movie
 The Lion King II: Simba's Pride
 102 Dalmatians (song: "Cruella De Vil 2000"

Theatre
 Newsies

Television
 The Wubbulous World of Dr. Seuss

Awards and nominations

References

External links
 
 
 

Year of birth missing (living people)
Living people
American male songwriters
American musical theatre lyricists
Broadway composers and lyricists
Tony Award winners